Supple is a surname. Notable people with the surname include:

Barry Supple (born 1930), English academic
John Supple (c. 1810–1869), Canadian businessman
Paul Supple (born 1971), British weightlifter
Shane Supple (born 1987), Irish footballer
Tim Supple (born 1962), English theatre director

See also
Violet Cliff (née Supple) (1916–2003), British skater
Flexibility (disambiguation)